Warleson Stellion Lisboa Oliveira (born 31 August 1996), commonly known as Warleson, is a Brazilian footballer who currently plays for Cercle Brugge.

Career statistics

Club

Notes

References

External links

1996 births
Living people
Brazilian footballers
Brazilian expatriate footballers
Association football goalkeepers
Campeonato Brasileiro Série B players
Club Athletico Paranaense players
Sampaio Corrêa Futebol Clube players
Cercle Brugge K.S.V. players
Expatriate footballers in Belgium
Brazilian expatriate sportspeople in Belgium